The women's 100 metres at the 2022 Commonwealth Games, as part of the athletics programme, was held at Alexander Stadium on 2 and 3 August 2022.

Records
Prior to this competition, the existing world and Games records were as follows:

Schedule
The schedule was as follows:

All times are British Summer Time (UTC+1)

Results

First round

The first round consisted of seven heats. The three fastest competitors per heat (plus three fastest non-automatic qualifiers) advanced to the semifinals.

Heat 1

Heat 2

Heat 3

Heat 4

Heat 5

Heat 6

Heat 7

Semifinals

Three semi-finals were held. The two fastest competitors per semi (plus two fastest non-automatic qualifiers) advanced to the final.

Semifinal 1

Semifinal 2

Semifinal 3

Final

References

Women's 100 metres
2018
2022 in women's athletics